Joint Base Anacostia–Bolling (JBAB) is a 905-acre (366 ha) military installation, located in Southwest, Washington, D.C., established on 1 October 2010 in accordance with congressional legislation implementing the recommendations of the 2005 Base Realignment and Closure Commission. The legislation ordered the consolidation of Naval Support Facility Anacostia (NSF) and Bolling Air Force Base (BAFB), which were adjoining, but separate military installations, into a single joint base, one of twelve formed in the country as a result of the law. The base hosts the Defense Intelligence Agency Headquarters amongst its other responsibilities. The only aeronautical facility at the base is a 100-by-100-foot (30 by 30 m) helipad (ICAO: KBOF).

Overview
Joint Base Anacostia–Bolling (JBAB) is responsible for providing installation support to 17,000 military, civilian employees and their families, 48 mission and tenant units, including ceremonial units (United States Air Force Honor Guard, USAF Band, USAF Chaplains, the Navy Ceremonial Guard), various Army, Marine Corps, Coast Guard, Joint Service commands and other DOD and federal agencies.

Bolling Air Force Base units also provide ceremonial support to the White House, the Chairman of the Joint Chiefs of Staff, the Secretary of the Air Force, and the Air Force Chief of Staff, mainly through 11th Wing, the United States Air Force Honor Guard and The United States Air Force Band.

NSF Anacostia falls under the command of Naval District Washington. The tenant commands for the navy aspect of the base include:

 Commander, Naval Installations 
 District of Columbia Army National Guard
 Department of Defense Inspector General 
 Marine Forces Reserve Center 
 Marine Helicopter Squadron (HMX-1) 
 NEXCOM BEM Gary Elliott 
 Office of Chief of Information 
 White House Communications Agency

Additionally, the Defense Intelligence Agency Headquarters has been located at Joint Base Anacostia–Bolling since 1987, and Coast Guard Station Washington, D.C., is located on the post next to the Capitol Cove Marina. The Naval Research Laboratory is not part of the Joint Base but is located immediately adjacent to it. Department of Homeland Security Office of Inspector General is also located in the base.

The Naval Media Center was transferred to Fort Meade in 2011.

History

Nacotchtank history
Prior to European colonization, the area where the Joint Base Anacostia–Bolling is located was inhabited by the Nacotchtank, an Algonquian people. The largest village of the Nacotchtank was located just north of the base, south of Anacostia Park. Two ossuaries (burial grounds) have been discovered at Bolling Air Force Base and other Nacotchtank archaeological sites have been found at Giesboro Point on the Potomac River. The two burial mounds, which included Nacotchtank bones and skulls, were discovered in 1936 by crews working at the air force base. The burial site was also likely once a Nacotchtank village.

Slavery
The Giesborough site was owned by one of the largest slave holders in the area, George Washington Young. The site was purchased in 1833 and operated as a large plantation until the start of the civil war. Large tracts of land were donated to the Union so that a cavalry post could be established.

Naval Support Facility Anacostia

The Navy began testing seaplanes at this facility in 1918, and it eventually became a naval air station supporting conventional aircraft. Located immediately north of Bolling Air Force Base, NAS Anacostia remained in service as an active naval air station until 1962, when its runways were deactivated concurrent with Bolling's due to traffic pattern issues with nearby Washington National Airport.

Redesignated as a naval support facility, NSF Anacostia serves as headquarters for Commander, Naval Installations, Navy Office of the Chief of Information, and continues to maintain a large heliport facility, primarily used by Marine Helicopter Squadron One (HMX-1) in support of "Marine One" presidential transport operations with VH-3D and VH-60N aircraft.

Bolling Air Force Base

Bolling's property has been a Department of Defense (DOD) asset since 1917. From its beginning, the installation has included the Army Air Corps (predecessor to today’s Air Force) and Navy aviation and support elements. The tract of land selected for the base was scouted by William C. Ocker at the direction of General Billy Mitchell. The base began near Anacostia in 1918, as the only military airfield near the United States Capitol and was originally named The Flying Field at Anacostia on 2 October 1917.  It was renamed Anacostia Experimental Flying Field in June 1918.

Not long after its acquisition by the military, the single installation evolved into two separate, adjoining bases; one Army (later Air Force) and one Navy. Bolling Field was officially opened 1 July 1918 and was named in honor of the first high-ranking air service officer killed in World War I, Colonel Raynal C. Bolling. Colonel Bolling was the Assistant Chief of the Air Service, and was killed in action near Amiens, France, on 26 March 1918 while defending himself and his driver, Private Paul L. Holder, from an attack by German soldiers.

In the late 1940s, Bolling Field’s property became Naval Air Station Anacostia and a new Air Force base, named Bolling Air Force Base, was constructed just to the south on 24 June 1948.

Bolling AFB has served as a research and testing ground for new aviation equipment and its first mission provided aerial defense of the capital. It moved to its present location, along the Potomac in the city's southwest quadrant, in the 1930s.

Over the years, Marine Corps, Coast Guard and National Guard units, as well as DOD and federal agencies also found the installation to be an ideal place from which to operate.

Throughout World War II, the installation served as a training and organizational base for personnel and units going overseas.

In 1962, fixed-wing aircraft operations at the air force and naval installations ceased, due to congested airspace around Washington National Airport on the opposite shore of the Potomac River.  Although fixed-wing aircraft operations ceased, the installations continued their important service to the country and the world, serving in many capacities, including service with the Military Airlift Command (MAC); the headquarters for the Air Force District of Washington; the Air Force 11th Wing; Commander, Naval Installations Command, Naval Media Center (now, Defense Media Activity-Navy) and many other military commands and federal agencies

The Air Force District of Washington (AFDW) was created and activated at Bolling on 1 October 1985 with the mission of providing administrative support to Air Force members. On 15 July 1994, AFDW was inactivated, but was reactivated 5 January 2005 to "provide a single voice for Air Force requirements in the National Capital Region" according to the base's website.

Joint base 
By 2020, more than half of the activity at Anacostia–Bolling fell under the US Air Force. Consequently, it was decided that installation management and support at the base would transfer from the US Navy to the Air Force. To facilitate the change, on 11 June 2020 the 11th Wing inactivated as the host wing at Joint Base Andrews and reactivated as the 316th Wing. After fifteen years of being based at Andrews, the 11th Wing returned to Anacostia-Bolling on 12 June 2020 and activated as the host wing at the base. A memorandum of agreement was signed between the Navy and the Air Force on 24 June 2020 which formalised the transition, however the Air Force did not officially take control until 1 October 2020.

Based units 
Notable units based at Joint Base Anacostia–Bolling:

Defense Information Systems Agency 
 White House Communications Agency
 Headquarters White House Communications Agency

Defense Intelligence Agency 
 Defense Intelligence Agency Headquarters

Department of the Air Force 
Office of the Secretary of the Air Force

 Administrative Assistant to the Secretary
 Air Force Departmental Publishing Office
 Inspector General of the Air Force

Direct Reporting Unit

 Air Force District of Washington
 11th Wing (host wing)
 Headquarters 11th Wing
 11th Comptroller Squadron
 11th Operations Group
 US Air Force Band
 US Air Force Honor Guard
 Arlington Chaplaincy
 11th Medical Group
 11th Medical Support Squadron
 11th Medical Squadron
 11th Mission Support Group
 11th Civil Engineer Squadron
 11th Contracting Squadron
 11th Force Support Squadron
 11th Logistics Readiness Squadron
 11th Mission Support Group
 11th Security Forces Squadron

Field Operating Agency

 Air Force Historical Research Agency
 Air Force History and Museums Program
 Air Force Historical Support Division

Department of the Army 
US Army Military District of Washington

 Joint Air Defense Operations Center

Department of the Navy 
Office of the Secretary of the Navy

Naval Criminal Investigative Service (NCIS)
 NCIS Washington Field Office

United States Marine Corps 
Headquarters Marine Corps

 Deputy Commandant for Aviation
 Marine Helicopter Squadron 1 (HMX-1) – UH-3D Sea King, VH-3D Sea King, UH-60N Black Hawk, VH-60N White Hawk and MV-22B Osprey

US Marine Corps Reserve (USMCR)

 Force Headquarters Group
 4th Civil Affairs Group
 Marine Corps Advisor Company A

United States Navy 
Commander, Navy Installations Command

 Naval District Washington
 US Navy Ceremonial Guard

United States Coast Guard 
Atlantic Area

 Fifth District
 Sector Maryland-National Capital Region
 Coast Guard Station Washington

Housing 
Residents are zoned to District of Columbia Public Schools. Residents are zoned to Leckie Elementary School, Hart Middle School, and Ballou High School. There is a charter school on JBAB, LEARN D.C.

There was previously a proposal for an on-base school dating to the 1960s. In 2010 Leckie had about 33% of its students from military families. Leckie Elementary is near Anacostia-Bolling's south gate. Around that time Anacostia–Bolling parents have advocated establishing a charter school for secondary grades on Anacostia–Bolling so they do not have to enroll their children in faraway schools. They perceived the zoned secondary schools as being of low quality; around that time about 20% of the students in the local schools had adequate or higher performance in mathematics and reading. In 2010 Anacostia-Bolling parents drove around 300 children to their schools, while 255 children took school buses to their schools.

In 2021 the LEARN organization signed an agreement to lease space at JBAB. It was scheduled to begin operations in Fall 2021 and is to expand to be a PreK-8 school.

See also 

 List of United States Air Force installations

References

External links

 

1917 establishments in Washington, D.C.
Defense Intelligence Agency
Intelligence agency headquarters
Military facilities in Washington, D.C.
Anacostia
Southwest (Washington, D.C.)